Weil am Rhein (High Alemannic: Wiil am Rhii) is a German town and commune. It is on the east bank of the River Rhine, and extends to the point at which the Swiss, French and German borders meet. It is the most southwesterly town in Germany and a suburb of the Swiss city Basel. Weil am Rhein is part of the "trinationale Agglomeration Basel" with about 830,000 inhabitants.

Geography

The city limits border France to the west and Switzerland to the south including the triple border of the three countries. Locally, Weil is situated in the region referred to as Markgräflerland.

The city's location on the Rhine and proximity to the Black Forest give it a continental climate, particularly suited to viticulture.

History
The town is first documented in the year 786 as Willa, a name which is thought to be of Roman origin.
The duc de Villars crossed the Rhine here in October 1702 to fight the Battle of Friedlingen during the War of the Spanish Succession. Weil was severely damaged as a result of the conflict.

Agriculture dominated local industry until the 19th century, when the city began to grow, aided by its favourable transport connections. A railway marshalling yard linking Weil am Rhein to Basel was built in 1913. Swiss textile factories were established in the Friedlingen quarter. 1934 saw the construction of a harbour on the Rhine.

After the Second World War the population again grew rapidly due to the influx of refugees and stateless persons. Between 1971 and 1975 the communities of Ötlingen, Haltingen and Märkt were incorporated and Weil am Rhein became a substantial town.

Since 2014, line 8 of the Basel tram system has extended across the border from Switzerland to terminate in Weil am Rhein.

Mergers
The former municipalities were merged into Weil am Rhein:
 1 December 1971: Ötlingen
 1 January 1975: Haltingen and Märkt

Coat of arms of the former municipalities

Twin towns – sister cities

Weil am Rhein is twinned with:
 Bognor Regis, United Kingdom
 Huningue, France
 Trebbin, Germany

Tourism and leisure

 The premises of the furniture maker Vitra, featuring buildings by architects such as Frank Gehry, Zaha Hadid and Tadao Ando, are an attraction for architecture fans. The premises also include the Vitra Design Museum.
 The Laguna water park
 Landesgartenschau Baden-Württemberg 1999, "Grün 99"

Notable people
Enjott Schneider (born 1950), composer and writer
Patrik Köbele (born 1962), politician, President of the German Communist Party (DKP)
Christian Streich (born 1965), football player and manager

Associated with Weil am Rhein
Erwin Bowien (1899–1972), painter and writer
Hubert Schardin (1902–1965), physicist, lived in Weil am Rhein
Artimus Pyle (born 1948), Lynyrd Skynyrd drummer, traces his ancestry to Weil am Rhein through Claus Koger (1572–1630)
Martin Beneke (born 1966), physicist, completed his schooling at the Kant-Gymnasium in Weil am Rhein

References

External links
 Official site 
 Vitra Design Museum 
 Laguna water park 
 Weil am Rhein: pictures 

Towns in Baden-Württemberg
Lörrach (district)
France–Germany border crossings
Germany–Switzerland border crossings
Populated places on the Rhine
Baden